Marta Carissimi (born 3 May 1987) is an Italian football midfielder, currently playing in Serie A for A.C. Milan Women.

Club career
She previously played for ACF Torino, CF Bardolino (now AGSM Verona), Inter Milan and Stjarnan (of Iceland). With Bardolino / Verona she has also played the UEFA Champions League.

In 2018 she moved to newly formed A.C. Milan Women.

International career
She has been a member of the Italian national team since 2007, playing the 2009 European Championship.

References

1987 births
Living people
Italian women's footballers
Italy women's international footballers
A.S.D. AGSM Verona F.C. players
Serie A (women's football) players
Footballers from Turin
Women's association football midfielders
Expatriate women's footballers in Iceland
Stjarnan women's football players
Marta Carissimi
Fiorentina Women's F.C. players
A.C. Milan Women players
ASD Femminile Inter Milano players
Torino Women A.S.D. players
UEFA Women's Euro 2017 players